Zapopan is a city and municipality located in the Mexican state of Jalisco. Part of the Guadalajara Metropolitan Area, the population of Zapopan city proper makes it the second largest city in the state, very close behind the population of Guadalajara proper. It is best known as being the home of the Virgin of Zapopan, an image of the Virgin Mary which was made in the 16th century. This image has been credited with a number of miracles and has been recognized by popes and even visited by Pope John Paul II.  The municipality is also the home of the Centro Cultural Universitario, which contains one of the most important concert venues in Latin America  and is the home of the new stadium for the C.D. Guadalajara.

The name Zapopan means "among the sapote trees". It derives from the Nahuatl word tzapotl "sapote" with the addition of the locative suffix -pan. It also has the nickname of “ex Villa Maicera” ("former Corn Village"), as it used to be a major producer of corn.  Its seal was designed by José Trinidad Laris in 1941 for the 400th anniversary of the city's founding.

History

From 1160 to 1325 many Zapotec, Nahua and Maya families migrated into this area from the south, with many settling in the Profundo Arroyo area. These first settlers eventually mixed among themselves and with newcomers such as Aztecs and eventually were known as Tecos. Many small shrines called “cues” were built here, mostly to worship the sun, although the primary deity was a god-child called Teopiltzintli or the corn god.

By the time the Spanish arrived, Tzapopan was a fairly large settlement, but it was in decline due to wars with various surrounding nomadic tribes.  It was subject to the dominion of Atemajac, also called Tlatoanazgo, which itself was subject to the Hueytlatoanazgo of Tonalá.

In 1530, this area was subdued by Nuño de Guzmán, but the establishment of a Spanish settlement of Zapopan did not happen until 1541 due to the Mixtón War. In that year Francisco de Bobadilla, encomendero of Tlatltenango moved 130 Indians from his lands to repopulate Zapopan.  Accompanying them was an image of Our Lady of the Conception, which had traveled to areas like Zacatecas as part of evangelization efforts. This statue would eventually take on the name of Our Lady of Zapopan. The sanctuary for this image was begun in 1689.

In 1824, Zapopan was named as the seat of one of the 26 department of the newly created state of Jalisco. When the departments were reorganized in 1837, it retained its status as seat. In 1873, General Ramon Corona fought against rebel forces led by Manuel Lozada “El Tigre de Alica” at Rancho de la Mojonera.

In 1979, Pope John Paul II visited the Basilica of Our Lady of Zapopan.

In 1991, the town gained city status in a ceremony that took place on 8 December, the 450th anniversary of the city's foundation.

The flag of Zapopan is derived from a Nahuatl pictogram represented by the fruit tree of sapotes with a flag on its side.
The name Zapopan comes from the Nahuatl word tzapopan, "place of sapotes".
 
Zapopan is the second most populous municipality in Jalisco and is the seventh most populous municipality in Mexico.
During the solemn session held on December 8, 1991, in which the 450th anniversary of the repopulation of the Villa Zapopan was celebrated, it was awarded the title of city.
 
The tourist attractions offered by Zapopan are diverse; from important religious points nationwide to world-class shopping malls. It also has different alternatives for ecological tourism such as El Diente, Bosque de La Primavera, among others.
Within this municipality are located the best hotels in the Metropolitan Area, the largest show centers in Jalisco and museums that host exhibitions of local and international significance.
 
One of the most important religious celebrations at the national level, the pilgrimage of the Virgin of Zapopan. takes place in the same municipal seat. On October 12 thousands of Catholic faithful come to witness the return of "La Generala" to its compound, the Basilica of Zapopan.
The typical food is the same as in the other municipalities that make up the Metropolitan Area but it is worth highlighting the elaboration of
cymbals based on the corn, which is the tender corn cob. Zapopan is also known as the "Villa Exmaicera" due to the large amount of expanse planted of this agricultural product.

Pre-Hispanic Epoch
The existence of a pre-Hispanic town called Tzapopan located in the current municipal seat is much disputed by various historians, since the locality was never mentioned in documents of the time, unlike other localities of the present day municipality and municipalities adjacent to it, such as: Ixcatán, Tesistán, San Esteban, Copala, Tónala, San Sebastián de Analco, Santa Ana Atista, Juanacatlán, Tala, San Gaspar, etc. This calls into question the existence of Tzapopan.

However, for some experts; Zapopan's history began during the years 1160 to 1325, when manyZapotecs, Nahuas and Mayans, arrived in the present territory of Zapopan near the present Deep Creek, these groups came from the south in search of a settlement. The inhabitants, over the years, were mixed with other tribes, such as the Aztecs heading to the Valley of Mexico; however, it was the [tecuexes] who dominated the terrain over time. Tzapopan was founded by the Aztecs and tecuexes, from the beginning it was a very religious city that had worshippers and shrines to the sun god, but mainly the worship of this city was towards the god Teopiltzintli. The diet of the inhabitants was based on maize, beans and fruits, and they were dedicated to hunting and fishing.

Tzapopan was a city with a large population; Despite this, the constant wars with other nomadic tribes caused a decay of the city until it was turned into a very minor settlement, subjected to the lordship of Atemejac that depended on the Hueytlatonazgo of Tonalá, making it a people insignificant and of little importance to the arrival of the Spaniards.

Conquest
The conquest of the village of Tzapopan began around 1530, when Nuño de Guzmán conquered the Kingdom of Tonalá (to which "Tzapopan belonged"), although possibly by then the village was insignificant or even depopulated. Finally with the victory by the conquerors in the Miztón War in 1541 the region is conquered, and licensed by the then viceroy, Francisco de Bobadilla, encomendero of Tlaltenango, who drew from his entruste the Necessary Indians to repopulate Tzapopan, in order to have close people of his who would serve him and help the foundation of Guadalajara, the task of repopulation and refoundation was left to Friar Antonio de Segovia who, together with Friar Angel of Valencia, delivered on 8 December 1541 as patron l in the image of the Tzapopan Conception. This image accompanied Father Segovia for ten years on his coming and going with the eagerness to Christianize Zacatecas and other places. It was this image, according to some historians, that is credited with the successful repopulation and subsequent calm on the part of the Indians. The construction of the current basilica was initiated in 1690 by Juan de Santiago de León Garabito.

In the historiography about the origin of Zapopan appears a legendary and perhaps fictional character named Nicholas of Bobadilla, Lord Encomendero that some sources point out as he who, with Indians from the region of Xalostotitlán, arrived in Zapopan around 1541 or 1543, according to the source to be consulted. However, contrary to what would be expected of a documentalist legal culture such as Spanish, there is no reliable evidence that some character with that name has benefited from some Indian mercy; if it actually existed, the testimonies of his time in these lands were simply lost in the sea of the bureaucracy of Seville, Cadiz or Madrid.

On the other hand, in order for there to be a repopulation, there must have been an abandonment of that population first; but, as settled in the different chronicles, the peoples of the eastern side of the San Juan de Dios River did not insubordinate themselves, moreover, it is mentioned for example, that Indians of Atemajac participated in the site of the endeavors in the Mixtón, under the viceroy of Mendoza, that is, none of the towns mentioned by Mata Torres, was razed during the War, so they were not repopulated, in any case, they were assigned to an encomendero, according to the forms of dominance indicated by the Spanish crown.

The key to the foundation of Zapopan is linked to the image of the Virgin. The Spaniards, since the time of the conquest of Tenochtitlán, had ordered the images of their gods replaced by images of the Virgin in the worshippers of the indigenous people; as was the case in all the worshippers of the center of the country, of Michoacán and during the conquest of the north and northwest. Although legend recalls the Virgin of Zapopan as "peacemaker in the wars against the indigenous people, Zapopan, indigenous people, was the headquarters of its most celebrated shrine in the whole of the West"

Friar Antonio de Segovia does not give the image to the Indians of Zapopan, it deposits it there because this is the place of worship that all the lords of these lands had in common, following the custom of spiritual conquest. If the delivery had been linked to valuations relating to the population, the image would have remained in another population of the region.

In conclusion, Zapopan was before the conquest a center of worship, continued to be so after that, as a center of veneration of a Christian image and it was subsequently that a population emerged, with Indians owned by Francisco de Bobadilla, encomendero of the region of Tlaltenango, not of Xalostotitlán, around 1570.

This Francisco de Bobadilla is a descendant of Pedro de Bobadilla, who belonged to the hosts of Nuño de Guzmán during the conquest; Peter Gerard has conducted the most comprehensive study on the institution of the encomienda in the seventeenth century in Mexico and identifies a Pedro de Bobadilla as encomendero of the Tlaltenango region based in Tepechitlán around 1608.

Nineteenth century: after independence

After the brief and failed imperial attempt with which the newly independent viceroyalty of New Spain had attempted to organize, on 21 June 1823 the territory of the former Province of Guadalajara was proclaimed as the Free State of Jalisco, the first of those who would make up the Federal Republic. The nascent state of Jalisco changed the scheme of Parties with which the territory of its jurisdiction - which had been used since the Bourbon reforms - was divided into the models of Departments, which in turn were subject to another larger unit: the Canton. Each Canton had a headline with a political chief who depended, in turn, on the Governor of the State. It concentrated political, military and fiscal decision-making.
In the first model of territorial organization of the State of Jalisco, of March 27, 1824, named as the Political Division Plan of the Territory of the State of Jalisco, Zapopan is a State Department and the town of Zapopan was proclaimed head of Apartment and named Villa. On November 18 of the same year, once the Political Constitution of the Free and Sovereign State of Jalisco was promulgated, Zapopan was ratified as a Department and attached to the first Canton of the State, with the head office in Guadalajara.
The Villa de Zapopan was located (and located) to the northwest of the city of Guadalajara, communicated with it by two paths: the first of them ran to the south-east of Zapopan, crossed the colomo stream and entered the west part of Guadalajara; the second exited to the east of Zapopan, passing through Zoquipan and Atemajac and then entering through the northern part of Guadalajara through the neighborhood of Mezquitán.

On April 6, 1837, he changed the model of territorial organization and Zapopan became a Guadalajara District Party. In 1846 another reorganization converted Zapopan back into an apartment of the first Canton of Jalisco whose head was Guadalajara. The model, with some minimal variations, is maintained until 1914 when the category of Municipality becomes the basis of the territorial division of the Republic. On April 6, 1917, the Political Constitution of the State of Jalisco recognized Zapopan as a Free Municipality.

The category of municipal headland remained unchanged until December 7, 1994, when, by decree 14358 the Congress of the State of Jalisco, changed the category of Villa that had since the beginning of the nineteenth century to that of Ciudad.

City

Basilica of Zapopan and Virgin of Zapopan

The Virgin of Zapopan is an image of Our Lady of the Conception which was made in Michoacán by native artisans in the early 16th century. It was donated for evangelization efforts by Antonio de Segova, and carried to Zapopan by Miguel de Bolonia, who had the image tied to his body. Legend credits it with bringing an end to the Mixtón War in the 16th century as well as relief from epidemics that plagued Guadalajara in the 17th century, a “miracle” that was affirmed by the bishop of the area. It was named the “General” (La Generela) of the Army of the Three Guarantees in 1821, with the military title ratified in 1852 and 1894 by elements of the federal and state governments. It is still called by this alternate name. In 1919, it was crowned Queen of Jalisco by the Pope Benedict XV.

Construction of the Basilica of Zapopan began in 1689. and finished in 1892.  It has been modified and expanded since then. In front of the structure is a large atrium. The atrium contains bronze statues of Antonio de Segovia, who donated the image of the Virgin in the 16th century and one of Pope John Paul II, with a child dressed as a charro, who represents Jalisco. The facade is Plateresque and the entrances have Ionic columns and coats of arms. The main altar is made of marble from Carrara and Cyprus with the image of the Virgin of Zapopan in a glass case at the top. Another important sculpture is that of the Holy Family, which has been in the church since 1832. It was sculpted by Victoriano Acuña.

In 1940 Pope Pius XII made the church a basilica. Part of the basilica building is dedicated to the Huichol Museum. The museum is dedicated to the art and culture of the Huichol people as well as some displays from the Tepehuán and Cora peoples. Another section of the basilica houses the Museum of the Virgin of Zapopan, where offerings left for the image can be seen, as well as items that have been used for its worship over the centuries.

Annually, a large procession in this image's honor takes place on the 12th of October, Columbus Day (called “Día de la Raza” (Day of the Race) in Spanish) . This tradition started in 1734, when this image was named the patron of Guadalajara and the protector against epidemics, storms and other calamities. Starting at 6 am, the image is carried on the streets from the Guadalajara Cathedral to the Basilica of Zapopan. The streets, including the wide avenue of Manuel Avila Camacho in Zapopan proper, are packed with dancers, vendors selling traditional food and crafts and spectators.  The image stops periodically to receive homage from the many traditional dance groups and mariachi bands along the way. Traditional dances include “Los Tastoanes,” “La Danza del Águila Real,” “la de La Conquista” and “Los Huehuenches.” Once returned to its home at the Basilica, celebrations continue and end with fireworks at night.

Other landmarks
On Paseo Teopiltzintli, which was the main thoroughfare into the city, is the Arco de Ingreso a Zapopan (Entrance Arch), built by the Spanish founders of the city. The arch area is decorated with sculptures and the arch itself is topped with large jars and an eagle. The Paseo Teopiltzintli leads to the Plaza de las Americas, after passing the Plaza Civica.

The Plaza de las Américas—Juan Pablo II Square is located in on the eastern side of the Basilica of Zapopan. It is paved with pink quarried stone, and contains a stone kiosk and four large fountains. There are two large sculptures in bronze depicting the god and goddess of corn, done by Juan Méndez. A statue of John Paul II is located here also.

The main walking corridor of the city is Andador 20 de Noviembre, which is lined with galleries, bars, and restaurants. On Saturdays, artists and antique dealers display their wares for sale on the walkway.

The Municipal Palace was constructed in 1942 as a school. It became the seat of the municipal government in 1968, and has been remodeled several times since. The facade is decorated with reliefs. The building's staircase contains a mural called “La Revolución Universal” (The Universal Revolution) done by Guadalajara artist Guillermo Chavez Vega in 1970. This mural depicts scenes from the French, Industrial, English, Mexican and Socialist Revolutions. It also contains images of indigenous art. The Plaza Civica or Civic Plaza is in front of the municipal palace, with a  flagpole and a bronze sculpture of the Mexican themed eagle devouring a serpent.

The Municipal Cultural Center, built in 1979, holds exhibitions of fine art as well as theatrical and dance events.  Next to it is the Plaza del Arte (Art Plaza) which is decorated with arches and columns of quarried stone and three permanent sculptures. The main mural of the building is entitled “La Historia de la Villa y la Revolución Mexicana” (The story of the village and the Mexican Revolution) painted in 1980 by Ricardo Peña. It also contains twenty three other murals done by art students over the years.

The Estadio Akron football stadium of the Guadalajara's club C.D. Guadalajara is next to the Bosque de la Primavera, in the northwestern Guadalajara Metropolitan area, just off the Anillo Periferico ring road and Avenida Vallarta in Zapopan.

The Neoclassical style Temple of San Pedro Apóstol was finished at the end of the 19th century. The atrium has a balustrade, and contains two large crosses with reliefs carved on them. The facade of the church is made of quarried stone with buttresses that flank the portal and side walls. Inside is a sculpture of Saint Peter, done by J. Cruz de la Mora in 1931, who was a native of Zapopan. The church also contains a painting from the 17th century done by Juan Correa called “The Baptism of Jesus.”

The Centro Cultural Universitario is an ongoing project among the University of Guadalajara, the Municipality of Zapopan, the state of Jalisco, and the federal government to create a major cultural venue in western Mexico. The main structure is the Auditorio Telmex, an important concert venue in Latin America.  There is also the Foro Alterno (Alternate Forum) which seats 15,000 people. The project was begun in 2001, and other institutions located here include the Juan José Arreola State Library of Jalisco, the Conjunto de Artes Escenicas (Scenic Arts Complex), and the Environmental Science Museum.

Other cultural venues in the city are the:
Galerías Theater,  inaugurated in 1991 and the site of modern musicals, concerts, cultural festivals, and conventions.
Museo de Arte de Zapopan (Zapopan Art Museum) presents permanent and temporary exhibitions as well as workshops. It is located in front of the Plaza Civica.
Museo de Cacería Albarrán (Albarrán Hunting Museum) has a Sudanese style facade. In this museum are three halls which exhibit 270 hunting trophies from many parts of the world, some of which are the full animals but most are heads. The building is of modern design and the collection belonged to Benito Albarrán, a renowned game hunter.
In addition, this municipality has Community Centers and Power Centers as:
 University Square (Sorian Super)
 Patio La Cima (Walmart)
 Avila camacho (Walmart)
 valle real (Walmart)
 Calandrias (Walmart)
 San Isidro (Walmart)
 AV.vallarta (Walmart)
 Parques Guadalajara (Walmart) 
 Patria (Walmart, Sams club)
 El Batan (Walmart)
 Plaza Cordilleras (Soriana Hiper, Office Depot, Cinemex and The Home Depot)
 Plaza San Isidro (Soriana Hiper, Famsa and Office Max)
 Bugambilias Square (Soriana Hyper)
 Bugambilias Panoramic Square (Superama)
 Plaza Las Fuentes (Comercial Mexicana)
 San Isidro Point (Superama)
 Plaza Santa Margarita (Bodega Aurrerá)
 Aviation Square (Soriana and Coppel Market)
 Tepeyac Square (Soriana Hyper and Toks)
 Plaza Las Aguilas
 Guadalupe Square (Super Soriana)
 South Square (Super Soriana)
 Plaza Aqueduct (Selecto Chedraui, Home Depot and Cinemex)
 Belenes terrace square (Cinepolis, Soriana)
 Gallery Square
 Plaza Real Center (Cinepolis, SAMS Club)

Zapopum
The Zapopum Festival started out as the municipal fair of Zapopan in 2005. Since, it has morphed into a major cultural event. It aims to be “a cultural reference point, whose purpose is to spread culture and bring it to the public who is accustomed to other types of shows.”  The 2009 event featured acrobats and circus acts from Spain, England, Germany and Italy. Some of these were “Alicia en los cielos” y the Spanish group Puja!, “Cupidos” and “Esferas” by Australian group Strange Fruit and performances by French mime Jerôme Murat. There are also workshops, themed pavilions and shows by popular Mexican artists such as Marco Antonio Muñiz, Gloria Trevi and Ricardo Montaner. The event has attracted as many as 800,000 people in past years.

Municipality

Almost 90% of the municipality's population lives in the city proper. Zapopan is the second most populous municipality in the state of Jalisco and ranks seventh in Mexico. Aside from the seat, the most important localities are Nuevo México, San Francisco Tesistán, Valle Real, La Venta del Astillero, La Magdalena (San José Ejidal), Nextipac, Ciudad Bugambilias, Base Aérea Militar de la XV Zona, San Esteban (San Miguel Tateposco) . This municipality is bordered by the municipalities of Tequila, San Cristóbal de la Barranca, Tlajomulco de Zuñiga, Tlaquepaque, Guadalajara, Ixtlahuacán del Río, Tala, Arenal and Amatitán.

Most of the municipality is flat with another quarter having rolling hills. The main elevations are in the Sierra de la Primavera and include Nejahuete, Tajo and El Chapulin. Superficial water flows mostly in arroyos east to the Grande or Santiago River. In the center of the municipality there are three dams called the Copalita, the Santa Lucia and the San Jose. Winters here are mild and usually are noticeable only in the higher elevations. Average year-round temperature is 22C with highs of 36C and lows of 11C. Rain principally falls from June to October. Vegetation in the municipality varies from pines and holm oaks in the Sierra de la Primavera and species such as jonote (Heliocarpus appendiculatus), strawberry trees and nopals in the lower elevations. While wildlife has nearly disappeared from this area, the Bosque el Nixticuil on the northern edge of the urban sprawl has been designated as a protected natural area and still is home to many mammals, reptiles, amphibians, birds and insects.

About three-quarters of the municipality's land is used for agriculture and livestock. About fifteen percent is forested and the remaining is dedicated to the city of Zapopan.  The principle crops are corn, sorghum, squash, tomatoes, chickpeas, avocados, mangos and plums. Some livestock such as cattle, pigs and domestic fowl are raised. Agriculture employs less than three percent of the population. About a third of the population is employed in industry and manufacturing. Major companies that have facilities here include Kodak, Motorola and Coca-Cola. The rest of the population is involved in commerce and services.

Tourism is mostly focused on the Basilica of Zapopan and other local churches; however, outside the city there are a number of natural attractions such as Ixcatán Geysers and the La Cola de Caballo waterfall. At the Santa Lucia dam one can fish and go out on rowboats. At Cerro del Diente are large rocks where mountain climbing, rock climbing and rappelling are practiced. The forest area has both fresh water and thermal springs and varied plant and wildlife. There are a number of signaled hiking trails with signs pointing out interesting points and plants. Another forest in the municipality is the Bosque El Centinela, which is an area that was reforested in the late 1970s and has mountain biking paths and campgrounds. A number of water parks such as Rio Caliente and La Primavera have been established.

The municipality has three main archeological sites. Construction phases of this pyramid date back from the fifth century to the tenth century. El Grillo is located in the Tabachines housing subdivision in the north of the Valley of Atemajac. This site has a series of fourteen tombs arranged along an arroyo which is now dry. La Coronilla is located in an area called La Experiencia. In and around the city of Zapopan, there have been finding of ancient tombs. One example is when about a dozen pre-Hispanic objects were found during a hydraulic work excavation at Ciudad Granja, in Zapopan, Jalisco. A pot, a vase and anthropomorphic figures are among the items discovered. These objects are of the Shaft Tombs Tradition which developed between 100 BCE and 500 CE in western Mexico. Further excavations are planned to search for a shaft tomb. The initial discovery was made by construction workers in May 2009 while doing maintenance work.

The La Mojonera Ranch is the site of the confrontation between government forces under General Ramón Corona and rebels led by Manuel Lozada “El Tigre de Alicia” on 28 January 1873. The event is called the Battle of La Mojonera.

Demographic evolution

In 1950 the total population of the municipality of Zapopan amounted to 27,115 inhabitants, practically the same population that in 2000 was only counted in the colony Santa Margarita. In ten years the population of the municipality increased 100% and by the year 1960 reached 54,562 inhabitants. The population grew 300% in the 1960s and reached a total of 163,185 inhabitants in 1970. The population increase during the 1970s was 238.5%, which amounted to 389,081 inhabitants in 1980. In 1990, Zapopan had 712,008 inhabitants and by 2000 the population exceeded one million inhabitants.

List of colonias 
 Arcos de Zapopan
 Colonia de Zapopan
 El Vigia
 San isidro ejidal
 Las Bóvedas
 Tesistán
 Constitución

Topography 

Hydrography
Its hydrological resources are distributed in different surface and underground currents. Temporary surface currents drain from the Atemajac Valley to the east of the municipality, directly increasing the channel of the Rio Grande or Santiago. The most important permanent surface currents are: the Santiago River and the San Antonio, Grande, La Higuerita, Blanco, Atemajac and Las Tortugas streams. In the central part of the municipality are the dams of Copalita and Santa Lucia, and the board of San José, in addition to several storages and wells.

Flora and fauna
Its vegetation is basically composed of pine and oak in the Sierra de La Primavera, in addition to the species cretón, jonote, madroño, ozote, mtama, savila and nopal in the northern and eastern part in the ravine.
The current wildlife list includes 106 species of animals such as the white-tailed deer, cougar, lynx, coyote, grey fox, badger, hare, raccoon among others and have been identified about 137 species of birds both migratory and resident and we can observe falcons, eagles, herons, tordos, quails, roadrunners, woodpeckers and many more.

Soil
The territory consists of land of the tertiary and quaternary periods. Zapopan, according to the type and land use, has obtained for several years the first national place in yield per hectare.

Policy 

As in the rest of the municipalities in Mexico, Zapopan is governed by a municipal president who holds executive power for three consecutive years; this position is held, from 2015 to 2018, by Pablo Lemus of the [Citizen Movement Party]. Legislative power rests with the [cabildo], occupied by persons elected by the municipal president when he seizes power.

The municipality is divided into three Federal Electoral Districts of Mexico, for the purpose of electing city representatives in federal legislative power. These districts are the IV, VI and X of the state of Jalisco.

Zapopan's [City Hall] is responsible for providing the public services of localities within the municipality: drinking water, drainage, street lighting, public safety, traffic regulation, maintenance of parks, gardens and cemeteries and urban planning. They participate in [public education], rescue and emergency services, environmental protection and the maintenance of parks and historical monuments. They also have the power to collect property taxes and other payments, although it can get more funds from the [Jalisco State Government of Jalisco] and Mexico's Federal Government Policy.

Economy

About three-quarters of the municipality's land is used for agriculture and livestock. About 15 percent of the land is covered with forests, and the rest are part of the urban area. The main crops are maize, sorgo, pumpkin, tomato, snap, avocado, mango (fruit)-mango, and plum. cows, pigs and poultry are raised. Agriculture employs less than 3% of the population. About one-third of the population is employed in industry and manufacturing. Major facilities include: Sabritas, Intel, Grupo Bimbo, Flextronics, Motorola, Jaguar Cars' Jaguar and Coca-Cola. The rest of the population is involved in trade and services.

Zapopan features shopping malls, private hospitals and highly valued residential areas. Zapopan is the second richest municipality in the country, behind San Pedro Garza García of the Monterrey Metropolitan Area, and one of the richest sub-jurisdictions in America.

Government

Education

Universities
There are several top ranking universities, including the Universidad Panamericana, campus Guadalajara, Universidad Autonoma de Guadalajara and the Instituto Tecnológico y de Estudios Superiores de Monterrey (ITESM) has its second biggest campus in the city.

Primary and secondary schools 

Schools include:
Colegio Alemán de Guadalajara, a German international school
Lycée Français de Guadalajara, a French international school
Instituto de Ciencias, a Jesuit private catholic school
Instituto Miguel Ángel de Occidente
Colegio Cervantes, run by Marist Brothers, private catholic school

Weekend supplementary education 

It provides lessons in the afternoon.

Coat of arms 
The Coat of arms of Zapopan is the emblem that represents the municipality, which is used by the municipal government of Zapopan as a seal in all its official documents, also the shield has great historical value for the municipality because it represents a tree of Zapote from which the town took its name.

The coat presents the shape of the semicircular or semicircular Spanish Coat of Arms, and is fitted by a blue edge. It contains, in a sinople (green) background and a gold field, a tree that is also made of sinople and fruity with seven cherimoyas or gold zapotes; to its reclining trunk a spear pole with a flag of gules and behind, a dog in a silver contoured jump; instead of a simple gules cross, accompanied by a semicircular silver badge with the nickname of sinople: HOC SIGNUM VINCIT (This Sign Shall Win).

Culture 

Since Zapopan is part of the Guadalajara Metropolitan Area, and due to the great cultural movement that the city of Guadalajara currently lives, the municipality has a great wealth in terms of culture, because it has a large list of events and cultural expressions, all this supported by many public and private institutions that operate in and around the municipality, especially the government and the University of Guadalajara.

Expressions of popular culture 

In the municipality a wide variety of festivities with various themes are carried out, such as Zapopum! And the October Parties, in addition to many festivals held in the municipality of Guadalajara that without place of doubt greatly influence the life of the zapopanos. Zapopan has several historical cultural riches, distributed throughout its territory, including the municipal seat that houses several colonial buildings of a religious and civil nature, whose architectural styles represent the ethnic diversity of the municipality,

Museums and galleries 

As part of the conurbation of the city of Guadalajara, Zapopan is a municipality with a very wide cultural infrastructure in terms of museums. One of the main museums of the municipality is the Zapopan Art Museum (MAZ), museum and cultural center, which seeks to disseminate the best expressions of artistic activities and exhibitions in its various manifestations. It has three exhibition halls and a multidisciplinary forum that will host contemporary proposals for plastic, music, dance, theater and audiovisual media.

The Trompo Mágico is an interactive museum dedicated especially to children, presenting various topics related to art, science, civics, among others, as well as activities. The Garden of Art is an exhibition and sale of outdoor art, which takes place every Sunday at the Glorieta Chapalita.
The Mexican Air Force Air College has a historic gallery of the Mexican Air Force, Mexican expeditionary air force hall and aircraft model room.
The Benito Albarrán Hunting Museum is a house in the Sudan style, and has kept an extraordinary taxidermy collection for 31 years, of animals hunted by Don Benito Albarrán, on three different continents of America, Euroasia and Africa; 270 hunting pieces of one hundred and ten different species presented in dioramas of great realism and atmosphere.
The Huichol Wixárica Museum of Art offers visitors a permanent display of handicrafts by this ethnic group. Sale and display of shirts, briefs, backpacks, skirts, blouses, necklaces, earrings, rings, bracelets and small bags of chaquira. In addition to masks carved in wood and photographs with everyday scenes of the rural life of this ethnic group.
The Museum of the Virgin of Zapopan presents an impressive collection of mantles of silver and gold threads, offerings made to the Virgin as a token of gratitude for some miracle, ancient paintings, niches in which the image was transported and a collection of various items used in past centuries for decoration.
The box museum in Zapopan Palace of Culture and Communication

Plastic arts 

The municipality has large paintings, among which "The Baptism of Jesus" carried out in the 17th century by Juan Correa, the mural of "The History of the Villa and the Mexican Revolution" painted in 1980 by Ricardo Peña is in the Municipal Center of Culture, where there are also 23 other murals made by painting students. In the municipal palace you can admire a mural made in 1970 by Guillermo Chavez Vega, a Tapatio painter, where scenes from the French, Industrial, English, Mexican and Socialist revolutions are captured.

Gastronomy 
Like the rest of Mexico, there are multiple processed foods based on corn such as pozole, tamales and atole. Also, and as in the municipality of Guadalajara, some typical dishes such as torta ahogada and esquites, cooked corn kernels that are served in a glass stand out and are accompanied, according to taste, ingredients such as lemon, salt, chili powder, cream and cheese, among others.
Among the traditional sweets are those prepared with coconut as alfajor and cocadas, and a variety of sweets prepared with milk.

Archaeological zones 

Sports

The sports that are practiced in the municipality of Zapopan are very varied thanks to the important infrastructure existing in the urban area of the same. The Municipal Sports Council (COMUDE) of Zapopan is the public institution responsible for promoting physical activity, sport and social recreation, as well as trying to promote the use of sports units in the municipality. The sports infrastructure of the municipality is very large, has about 54 sports units distributed in the different locations of the municipality, in these units are carried out the practice of sports and recreational activities, also serve as schools of initiation to sport.

The municipality has been and will host various sporting events of national and international size. Also in October 2011, the municipality of Zapopan was home to some of the competitions of the Pan American Games of 2011 held in Guadalajara.

For these competitions the track of the Estadio Panamericano were approved by the International Association of Athletics Federations (IAAF) in 2011, with the idea that it was used by both athletes and the baseball team of the Charros de Jalisco, but in 2015, the head of CODE Jalisco, Andre Marx Miranda reported that during that year it would only be used by the baseball team. Although it should be expected that after this year it will be reconsidered as originally approved.

The city has the Three of March Stadium, which is home to the club Tecos, Group XI team of the Third Division. Also the Chivas de Guadalajara have the Estadio Chivas which was inaugurated in July 2010 and has witnessed important events such as: the final of Pan American Football: Mexico vs Argentina and Clausura of the Pan American Games Guadalajara 2011, Final of the Copa Libertadores Chivas de Guadalajara vs International Porto Alegre one-way game. and several concerts.

Via RecreActiva 
The Vía RecreActiva in the Municipality of Zapopan, is a social program in which road spaces are enabled for mass use for recreational and recreational purposes by people of all ages. It operates on Sundays from 8:00 a.m. to 2:00 p.m. During said schedule, the circulation of motor vehicles is restricted along established routes, allowing only pedestrians and non-motorized vehicles to pass through.

There are currently three routes in Zapopan:

  'ROUTE 1: South Extension'   Avenida de las Rosas (López Mateos) -Tepeyac-Abogados-Beethoven-Independencia (Metropolitan Park) .
  'ROUTE 2: South Extension'   Labna (Tepeyac) -Amado Nervo-Pegaso-Sagittarius-Galileo Galilei-Mariano Otero-Tepeyac-Las Torres (Guadalupe Avenue) .
  'ROUTE 3: North Extension'   Lienzo Charro Zapopan, Avenida Hidalgo-May 5-Industria-Avenida los Laureles-Dr. Luis Farias-Enrique Díaz de León-Miguel Amaya-Gral. Agustín Olachea-Lic. Luis Manuel Rojas-J. Aguirre E.-Peripheral North-de los Tabachines-Paseo de los Rasmbuesos (promenade of yours) .

Twin towns – sister cities

Zapopan is twinned with:

 Antigua Guatemala, Guatemala
 Cartago, Costa Rica
 Changwon, South Korea
 Chengdu, China
 Częstochowa, Poland
 Grand Rapids, Michigan, United States
 Jinan, China

 Marianao (Havana), Cuba
 Rosemead, California, United States
 Saginaw, Michigan, United States
 San Pedro Sula, Honduras
 Adelaide, Australia
 Kiryat Bialik, Israel

Domestic cooperation

 Atengo, Jalisco
 Bahía de Banderas, Nayarit
 El Grullo, Jalisco
 Veracruz, Veracruz
 Zapotlán el Grande, Jalisco

Agreements cooperation
 Amsterdam, the Netherlands
 Phoenix, Arizona, United States
 Medellin, Colombia
 Zaragoza, Spain
 Stuttgart, Germany
 Angoulême, France

References

External links

 
Municipalities of Jalisco
Guadalajara metropolitan area
1541 establishments in New Spain
Edge cities in Mexico